Callum Smith may refer to:
Callum Smith (born 1990), British professional boxer
Callum Smith (skier) (born 1992), British cross-country skier
Callum Smith (footballer) (born 1999), Scottish footballer for Dunfermline Athletic

See also